The Roman Catholic Diocese of Saint John, New Brunswick (erected 30 September 1842, as the Diocese of Saint John in America) is a suffragan of the Archdiocese of Moncton. It was renamed on 15 November 1924.

Bishops

Ordinaries
William Dollard (1842–1851)
Thomas Louis Connolly, O.F.M.Cap. (1852–1859), appointed Archbishop of Halifax, Nova Scotia
John Sweeny (1859–1901)
Timothy Casey (1901–1912), appointed Archbishop of Vancouver, British Columbia
Edward Alfred Le Blanc (1912–1935)
Patrick Albert Bray, C.I.M. (1936–1953)
Alfred Bertram Leverman (1953–1968)
Joseph Neil MacNeil (1969–1973), appointed Archbishop of Edmonton, Alberta
Arthur Joseph Gilbert (1974–1986)
Joseph Edward Troy (1986–1997) 
Joseph Faber MacDonald, C.S.C. (1998–2006) 
Martin William Currie (2006–2007) 
Robert Harris (2007–2019) 
, CC (2019-)

Coadjutor bishops
Timothy Casey (1899–1901)
Joseph Edward Troy (1984–1986)

Other priest of this diocese who became bishop
 William Mark Duke, appointed Coadjutor Archbishop of Vancouver, British Columbia in 1928

Territorial losses

References

External links

 

1842 establishments in New Brunswick
Catholic Church in New Brunswick
Non-profit organizations based in New Brunswick
Religious organizations established in 1842
 
Roman Catholic dioceses and prelatures established in the 19th century
Roman Catholic Ecclesiastical Province of Moncton
Saint John, New Brunswick